The Arizona Game and Fish Department is a state agency of Arizona, headquartered in Phoenix. The agency is tasked with conserving, enhancing, and restoring Arizona's diverse wildlife resources and habitats through protection and management programs.

Operations
The Arizona Game and Fish Department is funded primarily by revenues generated through the sale of hunting and fishing licenses, tags, and stamps, as well as the discretionary purchases of hunters and anglers; it does not receive tax funding through the Arizona State General Fund.

Wildlife conservation
The Arizona Game and Fish Department has developed a "Comprehensive Wildlife Conservation Strategy" (CWCS)—a 10-year vision for managing Arizona’s fish, wildlife and natural habitats, input and partnerships with various agency cooperators, sportsman and recreational groups, conservation organizations, special interest groups, Native American tribes, county and municipal governments, and the general public.

Watchable wildlife
Arizona is home to more than 900 animal species and 50 million public acres of natural land. The Arizona Wildlife Viewing Program strives to manage wildlife while providing for the responsible recreational use of the resource. Much of the support for the program comes from the Heritage Fund, a fund started in 1990 by Arizona voters to further conservation efforts in the state. Funding comes from Arizona Lottery ticket sales.

Drought and wildlife 
The Arizona Game and Fish Department maintains 3,000 water catchments located throughout Arizona. The catchments provide water to wildlife year-round and particularly during the state's hot, dry summer months. Arizona Game and Fish trucks and airlifts water to the catchments. In 2020, 2.4 million gallons of water were delivered to fill the catchments, the first of which were constructed in the 1940s.

Media
The Arizona Game and Fish Department produces Arizona Wildlife Views magazine and a television show of the same name.

See also

 List of law enforcement agencies in Arizona
 Game Warden
 Ben Avery Shooting Facility
 List of State Fish and Wildlife Management Agencies in the U.S.

References

External links
 Arizona Game and Fish Department

Game and Fish
State wildlife and natural resource agencies of the United States